In geometric group theory, a presentation complex is a 2-dimensional cell complex associated to any presentation of a group G.  The complex has a single vertex, and one loop at the vertex for each generator of G.  There is one 2-cell for each relation in the presentation, with the boundary of the 2-cell attached along the appropriate word.

Properties 

 The fundamental group of the presentation complex is the group G itself.
 The universal cover of the presentation complex is a Cayley complex for G, whose 1-skeleton is the Cayley graph of G.
 Any presentation complex for G is the 2-skeleton of an Eilenberg–MacLane space .

Examples 
Let  be the two-dimensional integer lattice, with presentation

 

Then the presentation complex for G is a torus, obtained by gluing the opposite sides of a square, the 2-cell, which are labelled x and y. All four corners of the square are glued into a single vertex, the 0-cell of the presentation complex, while a pair consisting of a longtitudal and meridian circles on the torus, intersecting at the vertex, constitutes its 1-skeleton.

The associated Cayley complex is a regular tiling of the plane by unit squares.

Let  be the Infinite dihedral group, with presentation . For each path, there is one 2-cell glued to each loop, which provides the standard cell structure for each projective plane. The Cayley complex is an infinite string of spheres.

References 

 Roger C. Lyndon and Paul E. Schupp, Combinatorial group theory. Reprint of the 1977 edition (Ergebnisse der Mathematik und ihrer Grenzgebiete, Band 89). Classics in Mathematics. Springer-Verlag, Berlin, 2001 
 Ronald Brown and Johannes Huebschmann,   Identities among relations, in Low  dimensional topology, London Math. Soc. Lecture Note Series 48 (ed. R.  Brown and T.L. Thickstun, Cambridge University Press, 1982), pp. 153–202.
 Hog-Angeloni, Cynthia, Metzler, Wolfgang and Sieradski, Allan J. (eds.). Two-dimensional homotopy and combinatorial group theory,  London Mathematical Society Lecture Note Series, Volume 197. Cambridge University Press, Cambridge (1993).

Algebraic topology
Geometric group theory